Coleophora tshogoni is a moth of the family Coleophoridae. It is found in Turkestan and Uzbekistan.

The larvae feed on Halothamnus subaphyllus and rarely on Halothamnus glaucus. They create a leafy case, consisting of three obliquely imbricate (overlapping) pieces, the margins of which may more or less protrude downward. The initial case has the form of a slender tube and is located on the upper side at the caudal end. The valve is poorly developed. Larvae can be found from May to the beginning of October. There are up to three generations per year. Fully fed larvae hibernate.

References

tshogoni
Moths of Asia
Moths described in 1972